General elections were held in Grenada on 20 June 1995. The result was a victory for the New National Party, which won eight of the 15 seats. Voter turnout was 61.7%.

Results

References

Elections in Grenada
1995 in Grenada
Grenada
June 1995 events in North America